Ocellularia rivasplatiana is a species of corticolous (bark-dwelling) lichen in the family Graphidaceae. Found in Singapore, it was formally described as a new species in 2015 by Gothamie Weerakoon and Robert Lücking. The type specimen was collected by the first author from a low-elevation primary forest in the Bukit Timah Nature Reserve. It is only known to occur at the type locality. The species epithet honours lichenologist Eimy Rivas Plata.

The photobiont partner of the lichen is from the green algal genus Trentepohlia; their cells are yellowish-green and measure 6–10 by 5–8 μm. Although Ocellularia exigua is somewhat similar in morphology, O. rivasplatiana has larger apothecia with broader pores and a black-rimmed margin, which is filled with black-topped columella.

See also
List of Ocellularia species

References

rivasplatiana
Lichens described in 2015
Lichen species
Taxa named by Gothamie Weerakoon
Taxa named by Robert Lücking